The World Scholar-Athlete Games or WSAG was an event organized by the Institute for International Sport at the University of Rhode Island.

Events 
Bridge was added to the event in the 1997 WSAG.

Youth Day and Peace Summit

Controversy 
In 2016, Dan Doyle, founder of the Games and the Institute for International Sport, was found guilty of embezzlement and forgery.

The Games

References 

University of Rhode Island